Yudin/Judin (male) and Yudina/Judina (female) are Russian surnames derived from the name Yuda, a Russified version of the former calendar name Jude (given after Jude the Apostle), no longer in use. In Belarus and Western Ukraine the origin might be the Catholic name Judith. Also adopted by Jews following the Partitions of Poland, in reference to a village name Yudino or meaning "the son/daughter of Jude". 

Yudin/Yudina may refer to:

Yudin
Aleksandr Yudin (1949–1986), Russian cyclist and Olympics competitor
Andrey Yudin, several people
Benjamin P. Yudin (1928–1983), Kazakhstani oriental studies scholar, historian, philologist, Persian and Turkic manuscript expert, researcher, and teacher
Benjamin Yudin (born 1944), American Orthodox rabbi and instructor
Dmitry Yudin (born 1995), Russian ice hockey player
Erik Yudin (1930–1976), Russian philosopher, cybernetician, and Soviet dissident
Gennadi Yudin (1923–1989), Russian actor
Igor Yudin (born 1987), Russian-born Australian volleyball player and Olympics competitor
Igor Yudin (alpine skier) (born 1957), Belarusian skier and Olympics competitor
Ivan Yudin (born 1990), Russian footballer
Jānis Judiņš ( Yan Yudin, 1884–1918), Latvian Red Riflemen commander
Konstantin Yudin (1896–1957), Russian film director and screenwriter
Mikhail Yudin (footballer) (1976–2020), Russian footballer
Mikhail Yudin (serial killer) (born 1975), Russian construction worker and murderer
Nikolai Yudin (1898–after 1966), Russian historian of religion
Pavel Yudin (1899–1968), Russian Soviet philosopher, diplomat, and Communist party figure
Robert Yudin (born 1939), American politician
Sergei Yudin (surgeon) (1891–1954), Russian surgeon, military doctor, inventor, academician, and blood transfusion pioneer
Sergei Yudin (tenor) (1889–1963), Russian operatic tenor
Stepan Yudin (born 1980), Russian race walker
Vitali Yudin (born 1974), Russian footballer
Vlad Yudin (born 1982), Russian documentary filmmaker
Yuri Yudin (1937–2013), Russian hiker, known from the Dyatlov Pass incident

Yudina
Larisa Yudina (1945–1998), Russian journalist and newspaper editor
Lyubov Yudina (born 1981), Russian swimmer and Olympics competitor
Maria Yudina (1899–1970), Russian classical pianist
Yelena Yudina (born 1988), Russian skeleton racer

References 

Jewish surnames
Russian-language surnames